The 2009–10 Maryland Terrapins men's basketball team represented the University of Maryland in the 2009–10 college basketball season as a member of the Atlantic Coast Conference (ACC). Gary Williams was in his 21st year as the team's head coach. The Terrapins finished the season 24–9, 13–3 in ACC play, to claim a share of the regular-season championship with Duke. They lost in the quarterfinals of the 2010 ACC men's basketball tournament to Georgia Tech. They received an at-large bid to the 2010 NCAA Division I men's basketball tournament, earning a 4-seed in the Midwest Region. They defeated 13-seed Houston in the first round before losing to 5-seed and AP #13 Michigan State in the second round.

In a rare double-sweep of regular-season awards, Williams was voted as the ACC Coach of the Year while Greivis Vásquez was named the ACC Player of the Year.

Preseason

Recruiting

Roster

Season recap
The season began with Greivis Vásquez, Eric Hayes, and Landon Milbourne all leading the team as Seniors.

Accolades
Gary Williams
ACC Coach of the Year

Greivis Vásquez
ACC Player of the Year
2nd Team All-American
Bob Cousy Award winner
The Sporting News First-Team All-American
Wooden Award finalist 

Jordan Williams
ACC All-Freshman team

Schedule

|-
!colspan=9 style=| Exhibition

|-
!colspan=9 style=| Regular season

|-
!colspan=9 style=| ACC tournament

|-
!colspan=10 style=| NCAA tournament

References

Maryland Terrapins men's basketball seasons
Maryland Terrapins
Maryland
2009 in sports in Maryland
2010 in sports in Maryland